Mommie Dearest is a memoir and exposé written by Christina Crawford, the adopted daughter of actress Joan Crawford. Published in 1978, it attracted much controversy for its portrayal of Joan Crawford as a cruel, unbalanced, and alcoholic mother, with Crawford's other daughters, household staff, and family friends denouncing it as fiction. It was turned into a 1981 film of the same name starring Faye Dunaway.

Upon the death of their mother in 1977, both Christina and her brother Christopher were disinherited.

Synopsis
In the book, Christina contends that Joan, whom she describes as not wishing to be involved in parenting her, was an alcoholic who hit her regularly for frivolous reasons and placed more importance on her career than her family life.

Christina suggests that Joan may have adopted children as a publicity stunt to sustain her career. She implies Joan had a long list of affairs with men, whom Christina was required to call "Uncle" and, on some occasions, "Daddy". Christina writes that as she grew older and more challenging to control, Joan found excuses to remove Christina from home by sending her to various boarding schools and strict religious academies, often specifying in her instructions that Christina must be allowed no contact with the outside world. Usually, the threat of boarding school or the actual sending of Christina to these schools was used to punish Christina for defying her mother or fighting back against her abusive behavior.

Christina recounts several events in which Joan's behavior was unbalanced and at least one encounter with her mother where Joan attempted to strangle her. In another encounter, Joan reportedly discovered Christina's clothes hanging in a closet on wire hangers, which Joan detested instead of crochet hangers, and reprimanded her harshly. In an incident in which Christina refused to eat rare beef, Joan ordered the meat returned to the refrigerator and refused to allow Christina any other food for a day and a half until she finished the meal; Christina managed to hold out until her mother gave up and allowed her regular meals again. Joan allegedly disposed of her children's possessions to punish them for minor transgressions. Christina also wrote that Joan strapped Christina's younger adopted brother, Christopher, to his bed each night until he was 12, ostensibly to control his sleepwalking.

Christina reported that Joan's controlling and erratic behavior continued throughout Christina's adulthood. She asserts that Joan was jealous of her daughter's burgeoning acting career in the 1960's, to the point of taking over Christina's role in the soap opera The Secret Storm while Christina was in the hospital recovering from an operation to remove an ovarian cyst. (Christina's character was 28 years old; Joan was then in her 60s.) She also used the money to control the adult Christina's behavior by refusing to give her money for basic living expenses, even while taking her out for expensive meals and paying for taxis.

The book culminates with Christina learning that she and her brother Christopher were being disinherited upon the death of their mother in 1977, even though Christina believed that both she and her brother had reconciled with their mother before her death.

Reactions 
The book's publication in 1978 created an enormous amount of attention.

Some of Crawford's friends disputed the version of events presented in Mommie Dearest. Among them were Van Johnson, Katharine Hepburn, Cesar Romero, Bob Hope, Barbara Stanwyck, Sydney Guilaroff, Ann Blyth, Gary Gray, and particularly Myrna Loy, Crawford's friend since 1925. While acknowledging that Crawford was highly ambitious for much of her life, critics have suggested that Christina embellished her story. Douglas Fairbanks Jr., Crawford's first husband, stated, "The Joan Crawford that I've heard about in Mommie Dearest is not the Joan Crawford I knew back then." The two younger Crawford children, Cindy and Cathy, born in 1947 and adopted by Crawford, have stated many times that they did not witness or experience any of the events described in the book. Christopher Crawford stated, "I honestly to this day do not believe that she ever cared for me."

Bette Davis, longtime rival of Crawford's, denounced the book, stating, "I was not Miss Crawford’s biggest fan, but, wisecracks to the contrary, I did and still do respect her talent. What she did not deserve was that detestable book written by her daughter. I’ve forgotten her name. Horrible."

Liz Smith, writing in the Baltimore Sun, said, "I was inclined to believe Joan was misguided in her attempts to 'mold' her children—and was vain and self-absorbed like most great stars—but the stories of beatings and near-madness were over the top." Crawford's secretary for nearly 50 years, Betty Barker, also stated that while Joan was strict, Christina and Christopher were never abused.

Others such as Helen Hayes, James MacArthur, and June Allyson stated they saw questionable behavior from Crawford, but not outright abuse.

On July 20, 1998, Cathy Crawford LaLonde filed a lawsuit against her sister Christina Crawford for defamation of character. LaLonde stated in her lawsuit that during the 20th-anniversary book tour of Mommie Dearest, Christina publicly claimed to interviewers that LaLonde and her twin sister, Cynthia, were not biological sisters and that their adoption was never legal. Lalonde stated neither claim by Christina was true and attached copies of the twin girls' birth certificates and adoption documentation to the lawsuit. The lawsuit was later settled out of court for $5,000 plus court costs.

Epilogue 
In 1981, the book was adapted as a movie, starring Faye Dunaway. Christina gave negative feedback about the film.

The last pages of Christina's book suggest that she was not about to let her mother have the "last word" by omitting her daughter from her will. Biographer Fred Laurence Guiles later reported that Christina began writing her book before Crawford's death.  He has suggested that Joan's knowledge of its contents may have been a factor in her cutting her daughter from her will.

Christina later released a "20th Anniversary Edition", which included 100 pages of new material and omitted about 50 pages of original material. The second edition names specific individuals not named in the original book and focuses more on Christina's relationship with her mother from high school graduation until the 1970s. It also reveals what became of her brother and describes several incidents involving him.

Released by a smaller publishing company, the second edition included some novel promotional methods. This included Christina appearing at presentations of the Mommie Dearest film (based on the first edition of her book), where Christina lectured about the new edition of her book. Christina also appeared at readings with drag entertainer Lypsinka, who has made numerous appearances as Joan Crawford during stage acts.

In 2017 Crawford worked with lyricist and composer David Nehls on a stage musical adaptation of Mommie Dearest, which was produced by Out of the Box Theatrics in New York City.

References in other media

Saturday Night Live featured a sketch parodying Mommie Dearest on the ninth episode of its fourth season, airing on December 16, 1978.  Jane Curtin portrayed Joan Crawford as mercurial, ill-tempered, and micromanaging. Gilda Radner played an exaggerated version of young Christina as mute and possibly mentally handicapped, puffing her cheeks out and crossing her eyes as she sauntered around the set.  This sketch, which took place around Christmas, also featured Dan Aykroyd as Clark Gable, Bill Murray as Cary Grant, Laraine Newman as Katharine Hepburn, and guest host Elliott Gould as fictional character Archer Armstrong.

Victoria Beckham referenced the famous wire hangers scene in her music video for "Let Your Head Go".

An episode of the PBS Kids American-Canadian television series Arthur featured an episode titled "Caught In the Crosswires" in which the character Muffy Crosswire, who is extremely wealthy, shouts at her butler, Bailey, for hanging her clothes on wire hangers. She shouts out, "wire hangers? Wire hangers!?" before proceeding to tear her clothes from the hangers and squish the hangers with her bare hands; the scene was a reference to the infamous "wire hangers" scene from the Mommie Dearest book and its film adaptation.

Four years after Joan Crawford's death, Blue Öyster Cult released the song "Joan Crawford" as part of their album Fire of Unknown Origin (1981). In the final third of the song, there is a voice calling "Christina" with the lines "Mother's home" and "Come to mother". In the background, the word "No" is repeated over and over. This is in reference to parts described in the book.

The 1989 book Daddy's Boy: A Son's Shocking Account of Life with a Famous Father, is a comedic account of Chris Elliott's childhood, with rebuttals from his father, comedian Bob Elliot. It is an obvious parody of Mommie Dearest.

Editions 
 Mommie Dearest, Christina Crawford, William Morrow & Co., 1978, hardcover
 Mommie Dearest, Christina Crawford, Seven Springs Press, 1997, expanded edition.  The book's 20th Anniversary Edition restored approximately 100 pages previously cut from the original 1978 printing.  Christina Crawford bought back the book rights.

See Also
 I'm Glad My Mom Died

References 

1978 non-fiction books
Books about child abuse
Memoirs adapted into films
Books by Christina Crawford
Show business memoirs
William Morrow and Company books
Joan Crawford
Unauthorized biographies